The women's competition in the featherweight (– 53 kg) division was held on 18 September 2010.

Schedule

Medalists

Records

Results

References
(Page 27) Start List
Results

- Women's 53 kg, 2010 World Weightlifting Championships
2010 in women's weightlifting